The 1906–07 Western University of Pennsylvania men's ice hockey season was the 3rd season of play for the program.

Season

The team did not have a coach, however, David Johns served as team manager.

Roster

Standings

Schedule and Results

|-
!colspan=12 style=";" | Regular Season

† Rensselaer records the score of the game as 2–0.

References

Pittsburgh Panthers men's ice hockey seasons
Western University of Pennsylvania
Western University of Pennsylvania
Western University of Pennsylvania
Western University of Pennsylvania